The less-is-more effect refers to the finding that heuristic decision strategies can yield more accurate judgments than alternative strategies that use more pieces of information. Understanding these effects is part of the study of ecological rationality.

Examples 
One popular less-is-more effect was found in comparing the take-the-best heuristic with a linear decision strategy in making judgments about which of two objects has a higher value on some criterion. Whereas the linear decision strategy uses all available cues and weighs them, the take-the-best heuristic uses only the first cue that differs between the objects. Despite this frugality, the heuristic yielded more accurate judgments than the linear decision strategy.

Beyond this first finding, less-is-more effects were found for other heuristics, including the recognition heuristic and the hiatus heuristic.

Explanations 
Some less-is-more effects can be explained within the framework of bias and variance. According to the bias-variance tradeoff, errors in prediction are due to two sources. Consider a decision strategy that uses a random sample of objects to make a judgment about an object outside of this sample. Due to sampling variance, there is a large number of hypothetical predictions, each based on a different random sample. Bias refers to the difference between the average of these hypothetical predictions and the true value of the object to be judged. In contrast, variance refers to the average variation of the hypothetical judgments around their average.

Determinants of variance 
The variance component of judgment error depends on the degree to which the decision strategy adapts to each possible sample. One major determinant of this degree is a strategy's number of free parameters. Therefore, (heuristic) strategies that use with fewer pieces of information and have fewer parameters tend to have lower error from variance than strategies with more parameters.

Determinants of bias 
At the same time, fewer parameters tend to increase the error from bias, implying that heuristic strategies are more likely to be biased than strategies that use more pieces of information. The exact amount of bias, however, depends on the specific problem to which a decision strategy is applied. If the decision problem has a statistical structure that matches the structure of the heuristic strategy, the bias can be surprisingly small. For example, analyses of the take-the-best heuristic and other lexicographic heuristics have shown that the bias of these strategies is equal to the bias of the linear strategy when the weights of the linear strategy show specific regularities that were found to be prevalent in many real-life situations.

References

Rational choice theory